Jan Bøhler (born 1 March 1952) is a Norwegian politician for the Centre Party. Until 2020, he was a member of the Labour Party. He served as a member of Parliament representing Oslo, from 2005 to 2021.

Career

Stoltenberg’s first cabinet
From January to October 2001, during the first cabinet Stoltenberg, Bøhler served as State Secretary in the Ministry of Foreign Affairs. He left his position after his party lost the election.

Local politics
Locally, Bøhler was the party secretary of the local party chapter from 2002, and leader from 2004. Between 1991 and 1995 he was secretary to the Oslo city council chairman Rune Gerhardsen.

Parliament
He was elected to the Norwegian Parliament from Oslo in 2005. He was re-elected three times since, but lost his seat in the 2021 election.

Bibliography
Østkantfolk (2020; non-fiction), co-authored by Einar Haakaas
Nær folk (2021; non-fiction), co-authored by Trygve Slagsvold Vedum

References

External links

1952 births
Living people
Members of the Storting
Labour Party (Norway) politicians
Norwegian state secretaries
Politicians from Oslo
21st-century Norwegian politicians